Harris Glacier is located in the US state of Montana in Glacier National Park. Between 1966 and 2005, the glacier lost 77 percent of its acreage.

See also
 List of glaciers in the United States
 Glaciers in Glacier National Park (U.S.)

References

Glaciers of Flathead County, Montana
Glaciers of Glacier National Park (U.S.)
Glaciers of Montana